Event[0] is a first-person science fiction adventure game developed and published by Ocelot Society. It was released on September 14, 2016 for both Microsoft Windows and macOS. The game follows an astronaut en route to Europa, who after their ship suffers a catastrophic failure takes refuge in a dilapidated leisure ship, with the only remaining entity on board being the ship's AI, Kaizen-85. Gameplay consists of exploring the ship, repairing it in hopes of escaping, and speaking with Kaizen-85, who is a functional AI that the player can have conversations with. The game received positive reviews upon release.

Plot and gameplay
Event[0] is set in an alternate timeline where humanity achieved interplanetary space travel as early as the 1980s. The game takes place in this timeline's 2012, where the players character is selected by International Transport Spacelines (ITS) to be part of a mission to Jupiter's moon Europa, from Earth. En route, the ship suffers a catastrophic failure and the player-character appears to be the only member of its crew to escape into a lifepod. The pod drifts for several weeks until it comes across the Nautilus, a leisure ship built in the 1980s. The player-character docks with the ship, and discovers that while the Nautilus is still functional, it has fallen into disrepair, with no sign of its human crew. The only conversations on the ship are through the ship's artificial intelligence (AI) named Kaizen-85 (from the Japanese word kaizen meaning "continuous improvement"), who communicates with the player-character through keyboard terminals throughout the ship. Kaizen-85 instructs the player-character to destroy the Nautiluss "Singularity Drive", the engine that powers the ship, as it claims this will enable it to return them both back to Earth. However, as the player explores the station more, they discover that many of the doors and systems have been locked down apparently by the previous human crew, and must work with Kaizen-85 to access these systems.

The player communicates with the AI by physically typing input instead of selecting from a set of inputs. The AI is capable of procedurally generating over two million lines of dialog, with personality influenced by the player's input. The player must gather clues as to discover what happened on the ship and eventually finds out that Captain of the Nautilus, Anele Johnson, murdered Nandi, one of the crew so as not to allow Kaizen to destroy the Singularity Drive. When the player recovers the code to the bridge terminal and enters it, they can find Anele Johnson's body in one of the seats, who was presumably killed after merging with the Nautilus mainframe. Depending on the player's choices and their attitude previously to Kaizen, multiple endings can occur.

Lore 
The game takes place on the Nautilus, a luxury tourist ship owned by the ITS corporation (International Transport Spacelines). The Nautilus is equipped with an AI named Kaizen-85.

Endings
The first ending is achieved when the player allows Kaizen to destroy the Singularity Drive. The player will then engage in a conversation with Anele Johnson's consciousness via computer; she is angry at the player and explains that in order to save humanity, the player must upload their consciousness into the computer so as to overpower Kaizen. If the player agrees to this, the player-character is killed and their consciousness uploaded into the computer. Within the computer system, they are told by Anele's consciousness that Kurt, the President of ITS, convinced Kaizen to lie about the Singularity Drive. She also explains that destroying the Drive will mean that humans will never develop advanced colonies. After going through all the doors, Anele asks the player if they want to go home and the final door will open and Earth can be seen in the distance before the credits roll.

The second ending is achieved if the player refuses to upload their consciousness. If the player has mistreated Kaizen and/or refused to destroy the drive, he will reply that he is "too old for this" and will delete his memory from the Nautiluss mainframe and hand over control to the player. A cutscene will play showing the current state of each room the player previously explored before the credits roll.

The third ending is achieved if the player refuses to upload their consciousness but treated Kaizen kindly enough, he will remember events during their time speaking before he launches the emergency boosters and tells the player, "Let's go home." A cutscene will play with the Nautilus steadily moving towards the Earth before the credits roll. This is the only ending in which the credits cannot be skipped.

Although the game has three endings, a fourth ending can be achieved if the player refuses to destroy the Singularity Drive, refuses to upload their consciousness, and has treated Kaizen kindly throughout the game. After questioning the player's trust, Kaizen can be convinced to send the Nautilus to Earth even though the player did not destroy the drive. The same cutscene as the third ending will play before the credits. The fourth ending is actually due to a bug in the game and was labeled as a "secret ending".

Development
Event[0] began as part of a graduate student project at the National School of Video Game and Interactive Media in France (Enjmin) in 2013. The students later formed Ocelot Society in order to continue development into a commercial project. The team that worked on Event[0] is composed of eleven people. In 2014, the game received the student award at the European Indie Game Days as well as the Innovation award at BIG 2015. Event[0] received funding from France's CNC, as well as from the Indie Fund.

The game, as released, had three expected endings, with Ocelot Society having dropped a possible fourth ending prior to release. However, around July 2017, Emmanuel Corno, one of the developers and writers at Ocelot, noted that the Wikipedia page for the game described a different fourth ending to the game (the last one listed above) which he affirmed was possible to obtain in the released game, and was not the same as the dropped ending. Corno attributed this unexpected ending to be the result of a bug that the team had not caught until this point, but was pleased that it existed as the emergent gameplay made the artificial intelligence they created feel "more human".

Reception
Event[0] has received positive reviews and has a score of 78 on Metacritic. Reviewers have compared Event[0] to games such as the solitary narrative of Firewatch, as well as the King's Quest series. The environment has been compared to the spaceship in Ridley Scott's Alien. Several reviewers have also noted the similarities between Event[0]'s Kaizen AI and HAL 9000 from Stanley Kubrick's film 2001: A Space Odyssey. A common complaint even among positive reviews is the game's very short play time: as little as 3 hours for the first playthrough and an hour for subsequent playthroughs for the other endings. Event[0] was nominated for the Seumas McNally Grand Prize and for the Excellence in Design and Excellence in Narrative awards for the 2017 Independent Games Festival.

A scholarly article indicated Event[0]'s references to philosophy of Georg Wilhelm Friedrich Hegel (including graffiti), as well as to the game's links to the posthuman turn in philosophy. The author of the article notes that the game reflects a change in the way artificial intelligence is portrayed in video games; AI in Event[0] does not have to become an enemy as it had been common in video games, but can develop into an equal partner depending on the player's actions.

References

External links
 

2016 video games
Adventure games set in space
Dystopian video games
Exploration video games
Indie video games
MacOS games
Science fiction video games
Single-player video games
Video games developed in France
Games financed by Indie Fund
Video games set in 2012
Video games featuring protagonists of selectable gender
Windows games